Brian Tucker Zimmerman (born February 14, 1941) is an American singer-songwriter.

Early life 
At age four, Zimmerman began violin lessons, on a violin made by his grandfather. At age seven, his family moved to Healdsburg, a rural town in the Wine Country region of Sonoma County, California.

Career 
In December 1968 Zimmerman recorded and released his first album Ten Songs, produced by Tony Visconti. It was later described by David Bowie as one of his favourite albums. One track from the album, 'Fourth Hour of My Sleep' was later recorded by Mick Ronson's band Ronno.

In 1967, he collaborated with the Paul Butterfield Blues Band on the song "Droppin 'out".  The song appeared on the Butterfield Band album The Resurrection of Pigboy Crabshaw.

In 1985, Zimmerman turned to writing novels, short stories, poems and composing film music and compositions for symphonic orchestras.

In 1996 he formed his Nightshift trio, accompanied by bassist Jeff Van Gool, and his son, Quanah Zimmerman, a self-taught guitarist. The Nightshift trio  recorded Walking On the Edge Of The Blues.

In 2005, he released his most recent album Chautauqua.

Tucker lives in Stockay-Saint-Georges in Belgium, in the province of Liège, where he owns a studio.

Discography

Albums

Ten Songs by Tucker Zimmerman, 1969
Song Poet, 1971
Over Here in Europe, 1974
Foot Tap, 1977
Square Dance, 1980
Word Games, 1981
Walking on the Edge of the Blues (Nightshift Trio), 2003
Chautauqua, 2005
A Feather Flies Out, 2013

Videography 

All Fall Down, Canadian movie (2009)
Destroying Angel, film made in 16mm (1998)
The recovery , black and white film (1995)
Passing Through / Torn Formations (1988)
Eastmans Reisen, German short film (1981)
Souvenir of Gibraltar, film by Henri Xhonneux (1975)

External links  

 Tucker Zimmerman at the Internet Movie Database.

References 

1941 births
Living people
People from San Francisco
American violinists
Singer-songwriters from California